Radek Smoleňák (born December 3, 1986) is a Czech professional ice hockey winger. He is currently playing with the Mountfield Hradec Králové of the Czech Extraliga (EHL).Smolenak was selected by the Tampa Bay Lightning in the 3rd round (73rd overall) of the 2005 NHL Entry Draft.

Playing career
Smoleňák played briefly with the Chicago Blackhawks in the 2009–10 season when he was claimed off waivers by the team late in the pre-season. He played in only one regular season game with the Blackhawks, in which he registered a five-minute major for fighting. He also participated in the 2009 pre-season with Chicago while they played in Zürich, Switzerland and registered one goal in one game. After being placed back on waivers by the Blackhawks, he was quickly re-claimed by the Tampa Bay Lightning on October 11, 2009.

Smoleňák signed a contract with Pelicans Lahti from the Finnish elite league SM-liiga on January 30, 2012.

In 2009, Smoleňák received significant fan support in the NHL voting for the 57th National Hockey League All-Star Game compiling 10,471 fan votes as a write-in candidate.

Career statistics

Regular season and playoffs

International

References

External links

1986 births
Living people
Abbotsford Heat players
Ässät players
Chicago Blackhawks players
Czech ice hockey left wingers
Johnstown Chiefs players
Kingston Frontenacs players
Rytíři Kladno players
Lahti Pelicans players
KHL Medveščak Zagreb players
Mississippi Sea Wolves players
Modo Hockey players
Norfolk Admirals players
HC Slovan Bratislava players
HC Sparta Praha players
Ice hockey people from Prague
Springfield Falcons players
Tampa Bay Lightning draft picks
Tampa Bay Lightning players
Timrå IK players
Torpedo Nizhny Novgorod players
HC TPS players
HC Yugra players
Czech expatriate ice hockey players in Canada
Czech expatriate ice hockey players in the United States
Czech expatriate ice hockey players in Finland
Czech expatriate ice hockey players in Sweden
Czech expatriate ice hockey players in Russia
Czech expatriate ice hockey players in Switzerland
Czech expatriate sportspeople in Croatia
Expatriate ice hockey players in Croatia
Stadion Hradec Králové players